Pietrowice Wielkie  is a village in Racibórz County, Silesian Voivodeship, in southern Poland, close to the Czech border. It is the seat of the gmina (administrative district) called Gmina Pietrowice Wielkie.

The village has a population of 2,400.

Gallery

References

External links

 Official page in German and Polish

Pietrowice Wielkie